The Reynolds-averaged Navier–Stokes equations (RANS equations) are time-averaged
equations of motion for fluid flow. The idea behind the equations is Reynolds decomposition, whereby an instantaneous quantity is decomposed into its time-averaged and fluctuating quantities, an idea first proposed by Osborne Reynolds. The RANS equations are primarily used to describe turbulent flows. These equations can be used with approximations based on knowledge of the properties of flow turbulence to give approximate time-averaged solutions to the Navier–Stokes equations.
For a stationary flow of an incompressible Newtonian fluid, these equations can be written in Einstein notation in Cartesian coordinates as:

The left hand side of this equation represents the change in mean momentum of a fluid element owing to the unsteadiness in the mean flow and the convection by the mean flow. This change is balanced by the mean body force, the isotropic stress owing to the mean pressure field, the viscous stresses, and apparent stress  owing to the fluctuating velocity field, generally referred to as the Reynolds stress. This nonlinear Reynolds stress term requires additional modeling to close the RANS equation for solving, and has led to the creation of many different turbulence models. The time-average operator  is a Reynolds operator.

Derivation of RANS equations 
The basic tool required for the derivation of the RANS equations from the instantaneous Navier–Stokes equations is the Reynolds decomposition. Reynolds decomposition refers to separation of the flow variable (like velocity ) into the mean (time-averaged) component and the fluctuating component. Because the mean operator is a Reynolds operator, it has a set of properties. One of these properties is that the mean of the fluctuating quantity is equal to zero . Thus,
 where  is the position vector. This is possible because the two terms do not appear simultaneously in the same equation.

The properties of Reynolds operators are useful in the derivation of the RANS equations. Using these properties, the Navier–Stokes equations of motion, expressed in tensor notation, are (for an incompressible Newtonian fluid):

where  is a vector representing external forces.

Next, each instantaneous quantity can be split into time-averaged and fluctuating components, and the resulting equation time-averaged,

to yield:

The momentum equation can also be written as,

On further manipulations this yields,

where,  is the mean rate of strain tensor.

Finally, since integration in time removes the time dependence of the resultant terms, the time derivative must be eliminated, leaving:

Equations of Reynolds stress
The time evolution equation of Reynolds stress is given by:

This equation is very complicated. If  is traced, turbulence kinetic energy is obtained.
The last term  is turbulent dissipation rate. All RANS models are based on the above equation.

Applications (RANS modelling)
A model for testing performance was determined that, when combined with the vortex lattice (VLM) or boundary element method (BEM), RANS was found useful for modelling the flow of water between two contrary rotation propellers, where VLM or BEM are applied to the propellers and RANS is used for the dynamically fluxing inter-propeller state.

Notes

See also
Favre averaging

References

Fluid dynamics
Turbulence
Turbulence models
Computational fluid dynamics